The well travelled road effect is a cognitive bias in which travellers will estimate the time taken to traverse routes differently depending on their familiarity with the route. Frequently travelled routes are assessed as taking a shorter time than unfamiliar routes. This effect creates errors when estimating the most efficient route to an unfamiliar destination, when one candidate route includes a familiar route, whilst the other candidate route includes no familiar routes. The effect is most salient when subjects are driving, but is still detectable for pedestrians and users of public transport. The effect has been observed for centuries but was first studied scientifically in the 1980s and 1990s following from earlier "heuristics and biases" work undertaken by Daniel Kahneman and Amos Tversky.

Much like the Stroop task, it is hypothesised that drivers use less cognitive effort when traversing familiar routes and therefore underestimate the time taken to traverse the familiar route.  The well travelled road effect has been hypothesised as a reason that self-reported experience curve effects are overestimated.

See also
 Accuracy and precision
 Availability heuristic
 List of cognitive biases
 Weber–Fechner law

References

Cognitive biases